Gigandipus is an ichnogenus of theropod dinosaur footprint. It is known from the Norian-Cenomanian and it is most well known from the St. George Dinosaur Discovery Site (Moenave Formation) of Utah, where it was likely the apex predator.

See also

 List of dinosaur ichnogenera

References

Dinosaur trace fossils
Theropods